Kara-Bulak is a village in the Batken Region of Kyrgyzstan. It is part of the Batken District. Its population was 3,725 in 2021.

References

Populated places in Batken Region